is a 2002 Japanese film written, edited and directed by Japanese director Takeshi Kitano. A highly stylized art film, Dolls is part of Kitano's non-crime film oeuvre, like 1991's A Scene at the Sea, and unlike most of his other films, he does not act in it. The film has been praised for its cinematography (Katsumi Yanagishima) and features costumes by Yohji Yamamoto.

Plot
The film features three primary sets of characters, each within their own distinct story:

 A young man (Matsumoto, played by Hidetoshi Nishijima) who rejects his engagement to his fiancée (Sawako, played by Miho Kanno) to marry the daughter of his company's president. When his former fiancée attempts suicide and ends up in a semi-catatonic state, he takes her out of the hospital and they run away.
 Another young man (Nukui, played by Tsutomu Takeshige) is obsessed with the pop-star Haruna (played by Kyoko Fukada); he blinds himself when she is involved in a disfiguring car accident.
 An aged yakuza (Hiro, played by Tatsuya Mihashi), who tries to meet a girlfriend from his youth (played by Chieko Matsubara).

These stories do have some incidental visual cross-over with each other in the film, but are mostly separate. The first story is the one on which the film centers. The film leads into it by opening with a performance of Bunraku theatre, and closes with a shot of dolls from the same. The performance is that of "The Courier for Hell" by Chikamatsu Monzaemon, and it alludes to themes that reappear later in the film. Because the rest of the film itself (as Kitano himself has said) can be treated as Bunraku in film form, the film is quite symbolic. In some cases, it is not clear whether a particular scene is meant to be taken literally. The film is also not in strict chronological order, but there is a strong visual emphasis on the changing of the seasons and the bonds of love over the progression of time (Matsumoto and Sawako spend most of the film physically connected by a red rope).

Cast
 Miho Kanno as Sawako
 Hidetoshi Nishijima as Matsumoto
 Tatsuya Mihashi as Hiro, the boss
 Kanji Tsuda as young Hiro
 Chieko Matsubara as Ryoko, the woman in the park
 Yūko Daike as young Ryoko
 Kyoko Fukada as Haruna Yamaguchi, the pop star
 Tsutomu Takeshige as Nukui, the fan
 Kayoko Kishimoto as Haruna's aunt
 Ren Osugi as Haruna's manager

Themes
The film and each of its vignettes revolve closely around the theme of death. It was Kitano's intent to show death as neither good nor bad but a relative event. In an interview, Kitano stated, "The reason why modern Japanese and Westerners loathe the notion of death so much is beyond me. There really is no reason to loathe death," adding, "How you perceive this film can considerably differ depending on the position where you stand."

Soundtrack

All compositions by Joe Hisaishi.

 "Sakura" − 4:40
 "Pure White" − 2:48
 "Mad" − 4:55
 "Feel" − 4:58
 "Dolls" − 4:09

Reception
The film received generally positive reviews. Rotten Tomatoes gives the film 73%, based on reviews from 41 critics. Metacritic gives it 71 out of 100, with 16 reviews.

Adaptations
A stage adaptation of the film was directed by Carrie Cracknell in 2009 for Hush Productions and the National Theatre of Scotland.

References

External links
 
 
 
 

2002 films
2002 romantic drama films
Films directed by Takeshi Kitano
Films scored by Joe Hisaishi
2000s Japanese-language films
Japanese romantic drama films
2000s Japanese films